Evin Agassi, also written as Evin Aghassi (Syriac: ܐܝܒ̣ܢ ܐܓܣܝ, born September 1945), is an Assyrian-American singer who has released over 20 albums during his career. His music career spans for 50 years, but it peaked in the 1980s and 1990s.

One of the better-known Assyrian singers, he had since toured Australia, Europe and Asia. The majority of his songs were and are written by his brother, Givergiss Agassi, both in Persian and Assyrian. His first name is generally pronounced Evan by Iranian Assyrians and Ewan by Iraqi and Syrian Assyrians, with an emphasis on the vowels.

Biography 
Agassi was born in Kermanshah, Iran. He became involved in the Iranian national radio since his teen years where he recorded a number of records in Persian. He worked with many Iranian poets and composers and produced several popular songs, which were broadcast on the radio and TV stations, with several reaching the top ten records at the time.

While in radio, Evin Aghassi also sang Persian songs, which became hits at the time, one noticeable song dates back to 1974 entitled SHAHRZAAD which was loved by many Iranians and Assyrians all over the world. In 1976, Agassi was invited to the United States for some concerts in California and Chicago, which became a success. After returning to Iran, he produced songs based upon his pleasant experience in the United States. Courageously, Agassi made a few social political songs, forgetting the strong censorship in Iran. These songs, which were about humanity, equality, and freedom, were ultimately collected by the Iranian government and banned.

Due to these distressing outcomes and also because of the Islamic Revolution of Iran, Agassi relocated to the United States in the late 1970s for the social and political freedom there. Meanwhile, the Iraqi government was also rather vehement towards his songs, as they emboldened the Assyrians of Iraq, who opted for peace, freedom and human rights. As such, a few of Agassi's songs were banned there and his name was registered on a blacklist by Saddam Hussein.

To this day, he gives concerts regularly in the United States, Europe and Australia. In 2010, he's travelled to Syria, and in 2016 he has visited Iraqi Kurdistan, to perform at the concerts and parties there. His recent album "The Circle Of Life", released in 2012, has been one of his most anticipated albums, after his 7-year hiatus. Agassi currently resides in Modesto, California. Other than singing, he can play the classical guitar and piano keyboard.

Discography
 

Agassi has made over 20 albums in his 50-year career. In the years between 1960 and 1980 Agassi made singles, not releasing album for 20 years. Here are his albums:

 Evin Agassi (1959)
 Shamiram (1980)
 Alola (1982)
 Sayaada (1983)
 Khazadee (1984)
 Sadra Preqta (1985)
 Evin (1986)
 1987 (1987)
 Mometa D' Ata (1988)
 Evin 1989 (1989)
 Evin 1990 (1990)
 Evin 1992 (1992)
 Evin 1993 (1993)
 Yesterday (1994)
 Son of our Times (Bronet Zona) (1995)
 Evin 1996 (1996)
 Paradise (1997)
 Fisherman (1998)
 Evin 1999 (1999)
 Letter to God (2000)
 Memories (2005)
 Circle of Life (2012)
 45 years (2017)

References

See also 
 Evin Agassi makes YouTube appeal to Assyrians, TheAssyrian
 Profile at Qeenatha

Assyrian musicians
20th-century Iranian male singers
Syriac-language singers
Musicians from Kermanshah
Iranian Assyrian people
Living people
Exiles of the Iranian Revolution in the United States
1945 births
Musicians from Modesto, California